The 2013 Barum Czech Rally Zlín, formally the 43. Barum Czech Rally Zlín, was the eighth round of the 2013 European Rally Championship season.

Results

Special stages

References

2013 European Rally Championship season
2013 in Czech sport
Barum Rally Zlín